Eulitoma arcus is a species of sea snail, a marine gastropod mollusk in the family Eulimidae.

Description

The length of the shell ranges typically from 4 mm to 7 mm in size. Shells belonging to this species have been obtained at depths of about 750 m below sea level.

Distribution

This species occurs in the following locations:

 European waters (ERMS scope)
 United Kingdom Exclusive Economic Zone

References

External links
 To World Register of Marine Species

Eulimidae
Gastropods described in 1986